The Nanny is an American television sitcom that originally aired on CBS from November 3, 1993, to June 23, 1999, starring Fran Drescher as Fran Fine, a Jewish fashionista from Flushing, Queens, New York, who becomes the nanny of three children from the New York–British high society.

The show was created and produced by Drescher and her then-husband Peter Marc Jacobson, taking much of its inspiration from Drescher's personal life growing up in Queens, involving names and characteristics based on her relatives and friends. The show earned a Rose d'Or, and one Emmy Award, out of a total of twelve nominations; Drescher was twice nominated for a Golden Globe and an Emmy. The sitcom has also spawned several foreign adaptations, loosely inspired by the original scripts.

Plot
Jewish-American Fran Fine turns up on the doorstep of British Broadway producer Maxwell Sheffield (Charles Shaughnessy) to sell cosmetics after having been dumped, and subsequently fired by, her bridal-shop-owner boyfriend. Maxwell reluctantly hires her to be the nanny of his three children: Maggie, Brighton, and Grace. In spite of Mr. Sheffield's misgivings, Fran turns out to be just what he and his family needed.

While Fran Fine manages the children, Niles, the acerbic butler (Daniel Davis) manages the household and watches all the events that unfold with Fran as the new nanny. Niles, recognizing Fran's gift for bringing warmth back to the family (as Maxwell is a widower), does his best to undermine Maxwell's business partner C.C. Babcock (Lauren Lane) who has her eyes on the very available Maxwell Sheffield. Niles is often seen making witty comments directed towards C.C., with C.C. often replying with a comment of her own in their ongoing game of one-upmanship.

As the series progresses, it becomes increasingly obvious that Maxwell is smitten with Fran even though he will not admit it, and Fran is smitten with him. The show teases the viewers with their closeness and many "near misses" as well as with an engagement. Towards the later seasons, they finally marry and expand their family by having fraternal twins.Later in the series, it is also clear that Niles and C.C.'s constant sharp barbs are their own bizarre form of flirtation and affection; after a few false starts (including multiple impulsive and failed proposals from Niles), the pair marry in the series finale and subsequently discover they are expecting a child.

Episodes

Characters

Main characters

 Francine Joy "Fran" Fine (later, Sheffield) is the nasal-voiced, outgoing protagonist of the series who stumbles upon the Sheffields' doorstep and winds up as the nanny to Mr. Sheffield's three children: Maggie, Brighton, and Grace. She starts off working for her boyfriend Danny Imperialli in a bridal shop but is dumped and fired not long after. She ends up meeting Maxwell Sheffield and his family while going door to door to sell cosmetics. Her character has an outgoing and humorous personality. Fran, as a result of her mother's overbearing personality, often feels the need to date and is compelled to get married as well. She is usually seen getting into trouble and having to solve those problems through using her street smarts.
 Maxwell "Max" Beverly Sheffield is the male protagonist who ends up hiring Fran to watch over his three children, Maggie, Brighton, and Grace. He is a widowed Broadway producer, having lost his wife Sara four years before the start of the series. While he does have some success as a Broadway producer, he remains constantly in the shadow of his rival Andrew Lloyd Webber, who always seems to have the upper hand. He does not spend a lot of time with his children due to his busy schedule, hence the need for a nanny in the first place. Despite his mutual attraction to Fran, he tries to keep their relationship professional for fear of commitment. However, in season 5 episode 14, Maxwell tells Fran that he loves her and does not take it back. The romantic tension between Maxwell and Fran lasts until the middle of the fifth season, when the couple gets engaged; following several snafus, they are finally married in the season 5 finale.
 Niles is the loyal butler and chauffeur for the Sheffield family. He and Maxwell have known each other their whole lives. He bonds with Fran immediately, viewing her as the breath of fresh air that the Sheffield family needs. Niles is known as the household snoop as he is constantly seen listening in on conversations via intercoms, keyholes, and even in the very rooms where the conversations are taking place. He tends to manipulate events in Fran's favor to undermine C.C., his nemesis. In spite of this, over time it becomes clear that Niles has himself fallen for C.C. and their contentious relationship is a cover for a mutual attraction.
 Chastity Claire "C.C." Babcock is the egocentric business partner of Maxwell Sheffield, with whom she has been working for almost 20 years. She clearly wants him as more than a business partner. Maxwell, however, appears oblivious to her feelings, and Babcock's serious moves on him are thwarted by this, or by Niles. A running gag is that she cannot remember the names of Maxwell's children, in spite of having known them their entire lives. From her first meeting with Fran, she accurately views the newly hired nanny as a threat and tries to undermine her. Fran is not C.C.'s only enemy in the Sheffield house, as she has an even more contentious relationship with his longtime butler Niles (who hates her just as much as she hates him). In spite of this, over time it becomes clear that C.C. has herself fallen for Niles and their continual barbs towards each other are covering for a mutual attraction. Throughout the series she is referred to only as “C.C.”, with her full name only being revealed in the series finale, to both the other characters and the audience.
 Margaret "Maggie" Sheffield (later, Brolin) is the eldest child of Maxwell Sheffield. She is constantly seen bickering with her brother, Brighton, who views her as a nerd. Her relationship with Grace, is generally much warmer. Towards the beginning of the series, Maggie is shy and awkward but, with Fran's influence, she becomes a somewhat popular young woman. Upon meeting Fran, the two bond almost instantly, with Fran behaving like a friend or sister except on the rare occasions that Maggie needs to be disciplined.
 Brighton Milhouse Sheffield is the middle child of the family and the only son of Maxwell Sheffield. Due to being the only son, he often feels left out. This causes him to purposely bring about trouble for his two sisters. He does not bond with Fran Fine at first, having disliked all his previous nannies, but eventually becomes close with her as well. He variously plans to become a Broadway producer, like his father, or to simply wait until he can access his trust fund so he does not have to work.
 Grace "Gracie" Sheffield is the youngest and arguably most intelligent of the Sheffield children. At the start of the series, Grace was undergoing psychotherapy frequently, but under Fran's influence and guidance, she quickly reaches the point where she does not need it at all. As a result, however, she has a habit of naming medical conditions and using complicated words that Fran and Maxwell barely understand. This behavior is contrasted by her tendency to pick up some of Fran's faux-Yinglish slang and dressing habits.

Supporting characters

 Sylvia Fine (née Rosenberg) is the mother of Fran Fine, portrayed in early seasons by Fran Drescher (in flashbacks to Fran Fine's childhood). Sylvia is based on Drescher's real-life mother.
 Valerie Toriello is the best friend of Fran since attending high school together in Flushing, Queens, New York. When the show began, Val had been working at the bridal shop with Fran. Val is of Italian descent.
 Yetta Rosenberg Jones is Fran's grandmother and the mother of Sylvia and Uncle Jack. The character was played by actress Ann Morgan Guilbert. Yetta is based on Drescher's real-life maternal grandmother.

Cast

Main
The Nanny maintained an ensemble cast, keeping the same set of characters for its entire six-season run.

 Fran Drescher as Fran Fine
 Charles Shaughnessy as Maxwell Sheffield
 Daniel Davis as Niles
 Lauren Lane as C.C. Babcock
 Nicholle Tom as Maggie Sheffield
 Benjamin Salisbury as Brighton Sheffield
 Madeline Zima as Grace Sheffield

Supporting
Renée Taylor, Rachel Chagall, and Ann Morgan Guilbert were only given starring credit for their roles in the sixth and final season, even though they had previously appeared in most episodes of the series, particularly in seasons where the role of the Sheffield children was somewhat reduced.

 Renée Taylor as Sylvia Fine
 Rachel Chagall as Val Toriello
 Ann Morgan Guilbert as Yetta Rosenberg

Guest stars
Although largely operating around the main ensemble cast, The Nanny featured an enormous number of guest stars over the years. Notable repeat guests included Lainie Kazan as Fran's paternal aunt Freida, Steve Lawrence as Fran's never before seen father Morty Fine, Pamela Anderson as Fran's bubble-headed nemesis Heather Biblow, Ray Charles as Yetta's fiancé Sammy, Spalding Gray as Fran's therapist Dr. Jack Miller, Fred Stoller for the frequently featured pharmacist Fred, and Andrew Levitas as Maggie's boyfriend Michael.

Several celebrities guested as characters in single episodes, such as Dan Aykroyd, John Astin, Jason Alexander, Robert Culp, Cloris Leachman, Rita Moreno, Robert Urich, Wallace Shawn, Joan Van Ark, Efrem Zimbalist Jr., George Murdock, Roseanne Barr as Fran's cousin Sheila, Joan Collins as Maxwell's stepmother, Robert Vaughn as Maxwell's father, Twiggy as Maxwell's sister (in her first appearance, in season 1), and Dina Merrill as his mother. Others appeared as themselves, primarily in connection with Maxwell's business relations, such as Bob Barker, Chevy Chase, Carol Channing, Robert Culp, Billy Ray Cyrus, Lesley-Anne Down, Erik Estrada, Dan Aykroyd, Joe Lando, Joan Collins, Richard Kline, Bette Midler. Eydie Gormé, Jane Seymour, Dame Elizabeth Taylor, Elton John, Lamb Chop and Shari Lewis, Andrew Dice Clay, Lynn Redgrave, Hugh Grant, Margaret Cho, Jeanne Cooper, Melody Thomas Scott, Eric Braeden, Shemar Moore, Joshua Morrow, Hunter Tylo, Alex Trebek; media personalities Roger Clinton, Alicia Machado, Jay Leno, David Letterman, Sally Jessy Raphael and Donald Trump; and musicians Ray Charles, Burt Bacharach, Michael Bolton, Patti LaBelle, Lisa Loeb, Eartha Kitt, Brian Setzer, Celine Dion, Rapper Coolio, Whoopi Goldberg, Steve Lawrence, and Rosie O'Donnell. Jonathan Penner appeared as Fran's former fiancé, Danny Imperialli. James Marsden appeared as Maggie's boyfriend, Eddie, and Telma Hopkins appeared as Fran's "mother" in the episode "Fran's Roots". Scott Baio made an appearance as a rookie doctor who was Fran's former schoolmate. Jon Stewart portrayed a Jewish love interest of Fran's until it was discovered at a family wedding that the two were cousins; on the June 29, 2011 airing of The Daily Show, Stewart stated he agreed to make an appearance after receiving a personal call from Fran Drescher.

Marvin Hamlisch appeared as Fran's former high school music teacher, a Marvin Hamlisch look-alike. Fran Drescher also reprised her role of Bobbi Fleckman from the 1984 film This Is Spinal Tap and made a cameo appearance as herself in the third to last episode. Charles Shaughnessy had a double role as a fictional Middle Eastern oil potentate in one episode. Drescher's real-life parents, Morty and Sylvia, initially appeared as a couple in the waiting room of Grace's therapist and made subsequent appearances as Fran's Uncle Stanley and Aunt Rose; her Pomeranian Chester appeared as C.C.'s pet in more than a dozen episodes. Renée Taylor's husband, actor Joseph Bologna, and their son Gabriel Bologna, had guest roles on the show. Ray Romano appeared as Fran's former high school classmate Ray Barone, linking The Nanny with his comedy Everybody Loves Raymond. Romano and Drescher actually knew each other in high school. Tom Bergeron appeared as himself, the host of Hollywood Squares, in an episode in which Maxwell appeared as a star on the show's board as a replacement for Andrew Lloyd Webber. Tyne Daly appeared as a fellow nanny facing forced retirement. David Letterman made an uncredited appearance during a fantasy sequence, where Fran describes how she exaggerated her fame to impress a pen pal. Donna Douglas, who played Elly Mae Clampett on The Beverly Hillbillies, would make her last television appearance in an episode in which the Fines would buy the mansion (made famous in the aforementioned series) she was selling (Douglas was a realtor in real life), and in a nod paid homage to the Hillbillies closing scene with Donna and the cast waving goodbye to viewers.

Theme song
The theme song featured in the pilot was a version of "If My Friends Could See Me Now", performed by Gwen Verdon from the 1966 Broadway musical Sweet Charity. Following the pilot, the theme changed to "The Nanny Named Fran", written by Ann Hampton Callaway and performed by her and her sister Liz Callaway. Two instrumental versions of the theme song were used in the closing credits: one that is a direct instrumental version of the theme (used only in a few season one episodes), and another with a slightly different arrangement.

Opening credits
Along with the change of the theme song from "If My Friends Could See Me Now" to "The Nanny Named Fran" came the change of the opening sequence, which like the theme, describes (with the main characters in animated form) the story of how Fran Fine went from being fired from the bridal shop by Danny Imperiali to becoming the nanny of the Sheffield children.

The animated opening sequence begins with Fran Fine walking into the bridal shop, only to be kicked out by an unseen Danny Imperalli in one of those crushing scenes. Then, she hitches a ride in a cab, crosses the bridge from Queens, New York to Manhattan and arrives at the Sheffield mansion. Maxwell Sheffield opens the door and observes Fran. Then, he pulls her inside and she falls into the flower pot. Niles dusts her off and puts a cap on her head that reads Nanny. Fran whistles for Maggie, Brighton, and Gracie and the four of them form a conga line. C.C. arrives at the door and Fran bumps the door with her hip to close it in her face. Finally, the Sheffields, Niles and Fran gather on the couch for a group picture similar to that of the One Day at a Time series opening. However, when Fran presses the camera's button, smoke emits from the camera, covering the entire group in dust and messing up their best clothes.

Rosie O'Donnell employed the same team that created The Nannys opening credits to do the opening credits for her popular daytime talk show. O'Donnell mentioned this in an interview with Drescher on that show.

Production

Development
The Nanny began in 1991 with a chance meeting on a transatlantic flight between Drescher and Jeff Sagansky, at the time president of CBS Corporation, for whom she had starred in the short-lived TV series Princesses. Drescher persuaded Sagansky to let her and her then-husband Jacobson pitch an idea for a sitcom to CBS. Sagansky agreed to a future meeting once all of the parties were back in Los Angeles; however, neither Drescher nor Jacobson had any idea what to pitch.

Later, while in London, Drescher was visiting friend Twiggy Lawson and her family in London, England, where she went on a culture-clash shopping tour with Lawson's then-teenage daughter. Drescher was inspired by her behavior towards the teenage daughter on the shopping trip as functioning in a less parental but "humorous [...] kind of Queens logic, self-serving advice" mode.

Drescher immediately called her husband in Los Angeles with her sitcom idea, which she pitched as a spin on The Sound of Music, except, in Drescher's words, "Instead of Julie Andrews, I come to the door." Jacobson replied: "That could be it" and the idea for The Nanny was spawned.

Back in Los Angeles, the pair pitched their idea to Tim Flack and Joe Voci, both in comedy development at CBS. Sagansky brought in experienced producers Robert Sternin and Prudence Fraser, another husband-and-wife team with whom Drescher had worked before while guesting on Who's the Boss? in 1985 and 1986. Interested, both couples teamed up to write the script for the pilot together, creating a character with the intention to build off Drescher's image. "Our business strategy was to create a show that was going to complement our writing, complement me as a talent," Drescher said in a 1997 interview with The Hollywood Reporter. As a result, the characters draw deeply on the Drescher family, including Fran Fine's parents, Sylvia and Morty, and grandmother Yetta, who all were named after their real-life counterparts. Drescher also drew from her own life in creating her character. Like the character in The Nanny, Drescher was born and raised in Flushing, Queens, and attended beauty school. However, unlike her on-screen counterpart, Drescher never worked in a bridal shop; Drescher wrote that into the character as a tribute to her mother, who did work in a bridal shop. While visiting with his relatives in Fort Lauderdale around the holidays, Sagansky watched a few episodes with his relatives, realized that he had a hit, and ordered a full 22 episodes for the first season.

Crew

Most of the early episodes of The Nanny were shot in front of a live studio audience on Stage 6 at the Culver Studios. During later seasons the taping was no longer performed before an audience due to the complexities of the fantasy sequences, costume changes, etc. On Mondays, the cast went through the script as a table read. On Tuesdays and Wednesdays, they rehearsed before the series' producers and executives. And, on Thursdays and Fridays, the series was shot using a multi-camera set up in front of a live studio audience.

Nearly 100 crew members were involved in the shooting of a single episode. Although Drescher, Fraser, Jacobson and Sternin, the show's only executive producers for the first four seasons, coordinated "pretty much everything" at the beginning, according to Sternin, they eventually found their niche and in the following years, Drescher and Sternin decided to focus on writing story outlines, while Jacobson presided over the writing team, and Fraser observed the run-throughs. The four of them were later joined by Frank Lombardi, Caryn Lucas and Diane Wilk, who served as the series' executive producer throughout the fifth and sixth season respectively.

Professional laughers
Stemming from a home invasion and attack she experienced in 1985, Fran Drescher requested the show to provide prescreened audiences, based upon her fear of having random strangers invited to the productions. The show hired Central Casting to gather a cast of "laughers" who would be recorded during taping. The audio track of the laughers would then be added to the episodes in post-production. Casting director Lisette St. Claire became the world's first "laugher wrangler" for this new type of service, which would continue to be used on other shows.

Humor
The comedy in The Nanny was formulated with many running gags, which contributed heavily to the success of the series. Much of this formula was character-based, with all major characters possessing a specific trait or quirks that provided a source of parody for other characters. The conflicting elements of each character's own comedy were often played off against one another (Fran and Maxwell, Niles and C.C., Maggie and Brighton). Occasionally the characters would break the fourth wall and comment on the situations themselves, or Fran would comment to the audience or look into the camera. Other running gags are the many references to Beatles songs and the musicals Fiddler on the Roof and My Fair Lady. Most of the humor Fran uses is aimed toward a Jewish audience. She makes references to Yiddish words and teaches the Sheffield children to be stereotypical Jews (to never pay retail price, to go after men like doctors, etc.). Much of this humor is featured in scenes including her mother Sylvia.

At times, they would also make humorous references to the stars' previous careers or real life off-screen time. This was noticeable when Yetta saw her reflection in the mirror and thought she was seeing Millie Helper from The Dick Van Dyke Show (the role that Guilbert played on that long-running show), Maxwell remembering how he wanted to hire a former cast member from Days of Our Lives but thought he was not "British" enough (a reference to Charles Shaughnessy's former series), C.C. using props to hide Lauren Lane's real-life pregnancy at the time, and Fran meeting her idol—Fran Drescher—who gave her a hint on what she (the TV Fran) was going to do in the next scene in the second-to-last episode in the last season. Drescher also appeared in the series as tough-talking music publicist Bobbi Fleckman, reprising her role from the 1984 film This Is Spinal Tap, setting up an obvious visual gag where Drescher (as the Nanny) would disguise herself as Fleckman in order to get Mr. Sheffield's attention.

More running gags include Fran's frequent references to classic TV sitcoms (such as Gilligan's Island and Bewitched) and her many eccentric family members (most never shown, some of them dying); Fran lying about her age—especially to men; Maxwell fighting through his rivalry with actual Broadway producer Andrew Lloyd Webber; Maxwell's physical resemblance to Pierce Brosnan; Maxwell's fondness for Kaye Ballard; Sylvia loving food in excess; Niles delivering sharp one-liners, often aimed at C.C.; C.C. cold-heartedly reacting to situations that are usually sentimental to others (e.g. the death of Bambi's mother); Gracie psychologically analyzing various situations; Niles getting fired because he embarrasses Maxwell or gives Fran ideas that Maxwell extremely dislikes (such as suggesting that Max, C.C. and Fran go to Barbra Streisand's house); Fran and Val lacking intelligence and obsessing over material possessions (e.g. clothes); frequent references to Fran's flamboyant wardrobe, her "big hair" and her nasal voice (which was much less grating in early episodes); Fran frequently mentioning shopping at Loehmann's; Yetta making disconnected comments revealing her senility; Fran criticizing Maxwell's and Niles' reserved and inhibited British nature; Brighton morphing into a hopeless dork; Fran's attraction to Jewish males; Maxwell passing up the incredibly popular musical, Cats, then becoming upset when such an idiotic idea became a success; Niles' last name never being revealed; C.C. covering her long-unrevealed name (finally given as Chastity Claire in the series finale); C.C. failing to remember the names of the Sheffield children (even convinced by Niles in one episode that there was a fourth child named Sydney; note: she did not have trouble remembering in the early seasons); Sylvia constantly nagging Fran to get married; Fran finding solace in food when she's depressed; Fran's father, Morty, often featured in the series but never actually seen (until portrayed by Steve Lawrence in a few later episodes); Morty's only physical trait being the fact that he is bald, in which he is always comically losing his wig, and has several head mannequins to hold different wigs; Niles offering obvious hints to Maxwell and Fran about them realizing they should be together and hints from each other; C.C. pining over her unrequited romantic interest in Maxwell; C.C. developing a nervous tic and eventually ending up in a sanitarium; Fran obsessing with Barbra Streisand. In one episode Streisand's sister, Roslyn Kind appears singing a song with Fran thinking Barbra is at the Sheffield home. There was also the occasional tryst between Niles and C.C., contrasting with their typical open disdain for each other, which was actually love. Season 4 featured a running gag where both Fran and Maxwell kept secret from the other household members "The Thing" (the fact that in the season 3 finale Maxwell tells Fran he loves her, but then in the Season 4 premiere he takes it back). It is also following "The Thing" that whenever Maxwell makes comments denying he has feelings for Fran, she is temporarily "paralyzed" (she cannot feel her arm, her entire left side shuts down, etc.).

In addition, there is also a great deal of physical comedy in The Nanny including exaggerated falls and chases. Drescher's facial expressions, when shocked or surprised, can also be seen as reminiscent of Lucille Ball's portrayals of Lucy Ricardo and Lucy Carmichael. The parallels were suggested in a few episodes, where an exasperated Mr. Sheffield refers to Fran as "Mrs. Carmichael", and asks in another: "Mr. Mooney fire you from the bank again?" Another Lucy reference (in which the family travels to Hollywood) is when he alludes to Fran and "Ethel" stealing John Wayne's footprints, and again when Maxwell says "Miss Fine, you got' some 'splaining to do!" like Ricky Ricardo often said to Lucy Ricardo. The episode that featured a visit from Elizabeth Taylor (who also appeared on Here's Lucy as a guest star) began with Maxwell and Niles trying to hide the visit from Fran ("Boys, boys, boys. Now do you think my mother gave birth to a dummy 25 years ago?") followed by her gripe "You never introduce me to any of the stars that you know; I've got a good mind to take Little Ricky and... oh. Never mind." Also, there was a reference from the episode of I Love Lucy called "Ricky has Labor Pains" where Lucy and Ethel dress up like men and go to Ricky's daddy shower. In an episode of The Nanny, Fran sees a man watching I Love Lucy on TV and as the theme song plays she gets a sneaky look on her face and gets the idea to gain entry into Mr. Sheffield's men's only club dressed as a man. Viewers for Quality Television called The Nanny "the '90s version of I Love Lucy. It was well written and entertaining."

Broadcast

Domestic syndication
The show began off-network syndication in September 1998, distributed by Columbia TriStar Television Distribution on various broadcast television networks in the United States. The show had aired on Lifetime Television from 2000 until 2008. The show could also be seen on Nick at Nite from April 2009 to October 5, 2013, in the United States, but was pulled and its timeslot of 6AM-7AM was replaced with Hangin' With Mr. Cooper. It also appears on The Hallmark Channel in the Philippines, Super RTL and VOX in Germany, and Go! and TV1 in Australia. On February 8, 2010, Fran Drescher hosted a week-long marathon of The Nanny, titled "Valentine Schmalentine", on Nick at Nite. The success of the stunt led to Fran hosting "Falling for Fran", a similar week-long Valentine's Day marathon in February 2011.
On August 2, 2010, The Nanny began airing on TV Land, commencing with a week-long marathon and remained on the channel until 2016. On January 1, 2011, The Nanny began airing on Antenna TV, a new digital broadcast network. On August 16, 2011, "The Nanny" began airing on Logo. Similarly, on April 30, 2018, Freeform began airing the series, showing 5-episode blocks in the early morning hours. Additionally, the show can be seen on local US television channels.

Streaming
The series' third and fourth seasons are available for streaming on Pluto TV, the Roku Channel rotates between seasons 1–2 and 3–4, and on April 1, 2021, the entire series became available on HBO Max.

International syndication
Outside of North America, The Nanny is broadcast in various other countries and television networks, each with their own schedule for the series. In the United Kingdom, the entire series aired on the digital network Living. It is currently re-airing on newly launched channel TLC.
In France, the show was broadcast and rebroadcast the same multi-and was a huge success on the channel M6 then W9. The French title is Une nounou d'enfer ("A Hell of a Nanny"). The character of Fran Fine is very famous in France.

Other countries where The Nanny airs include the following:

{|class="wikitable"
|+ International syndication
|-
! Country / Region
! Name
! Television Network
! Dubbing / Subtitles
|-
| 
| Die Nanny (English: "The Nanny")
| ORF1 (2005–present), ATV (2006–2010)
| German
|-
| 
| The Nanny
| Network Ten (1994–1999), Nine Network (2007–2009), 9Go! (2009–2011, 2020–), GEM (2010–2011), 7flix (2016–2019), TV1 (1998–2013), TV Hits (2014), 111 (2014–2019)
| None
|-
| 
| The Nanny
| Eén, VT4, VIJF, VTM,
| Dutch subtitles
|-
| 
| Une nounou d'enfer (English: "A Hell of a Nanny")
| RTL-TV, Plug RTL (2011–2012)
| French
|-
| 
| The Nanny
| Rede Record, Rede 21, SET, Comedy Central (2012–present)
| Portuguese dubbing
|-
| 
| The Nanny
| Crossroads Television System, CBC (November 3, 1993 – May 16, 1994), CTV Television Network (September 12, 1994 - June 23, 1999)
| None
|-
| 
| La Tata (English: "The Nanny")
| TV3
| Catalan dubbing
|-
| 
| La Niñera
| Sony Entertainment Television
| Spanish dubbing
|-
| 
| Dadilja (English: "Nanny")
| RTL Televizija
| Croatian subtitles
|-
| 
| Chůva k pohledání (English: "Nanny")
| TV Prima
| Czech dubbing
|-
| 
| Alletiders barnepige (English: "All-times greatest nanny")
| TV3
| Danish subtitles
|-
| 
| Nanny
| TV3
| Estonian subtitles
|-
| 
| Nanny
| Nelonen, The Voice
| Finnish subtitles
|-
| 
| Une nounou d'enfer <small>(English: "'A Hell of a Nanny")</small>
| M6, W9, 6ter, TMC, TF1 Séries Films
| French
|-
| 
| Die Nanny (English: "The Nanny")
| VOX (2002–2011), Super RTL (2007–2012), RTL (1995–2002), FOX Germany (2010–2012), ZDF neo (2012–2014), Disney Channel (2014–present)
| German dubbing
|-
| 
| Ntanta amesou draseos (English: "Urgent nanny")
| Mega, Alpha, Makedonia TV
| Greek subtitles
|-
| 
| A dadus (English: "The Nanny")
| TV2, RTL Klub, Cool TV
|Hungarian
|-
| 
| Nanny| Channel 3
| Hebrew subtitles
|-
| 
| La tata (English: "The Nanny")
| Canale 5 (1995), Italia 1 (1996–2000), Boing (2006), Mya (2008), Fox Life (2009), La5 (2011), Fox Retro (2011)
| Italian dubbing
|-
| Latin America
| The Nanny| Sony Entertainment Television (Latin America)
| Spanish dubbing
|-
| 
| Auklė (English: "Nanny")
| TV3
| Lithuanian dubbing
|-
| 
| The Nanny| TV2, Astro
| Bahasa Malaysia subtitles
|-
| 
| The Nanny| Azteca 7, Sony Entertainment Television (Latin America)
| Spanish dubbing
|-
| 
| The Nanny| RTL 5
| Dutch subtitles
|-
| 
| Nanny| TV3
| Norwegian subtitles
|-
| 
| The Nanny| ABS-CBN, Studio 23
| None
|-
| 
| Niania (English: "House helper")
| TV Puls, Polsat, TVN 7
| Polish
|-
| 
| Competente e Descarada (English: "Competent and shameless")
| TVI
| Portuguese Subtitles
|-
| 
| Dădaca (English: "Nanny")
| Pro TV, Pro Cinema
| Romanian Subtitles
|-
| 
| Няня (English: "Nanny")
| Domashny, ДТВ
| Russian dubbing
|-
| 
| Nanny| TV3
| Swedish subtitles
|-
| 
| Die Nanny (English: "The Nanny")
| SF zwei (2006–2008), 4+ (2015–present)
| German
|-
| 
| La Tata (English: "The Nanny")
| RSI LA1
| Italian
|-
| 
| The Nanny| Hallmark, TrueVisions
| Thai
|-
| 
| The Nanny| Sky One, Living TV
| None
|}

Home media
Sony Pictures Home Entertainment has released seasons 1, 2 and 3 of The Nanny on DVD in regions 1, 2 and 4. Season 3 was released on March 17, 2009, in Region 1, almost 3 years after the release of season 2.

On August 27, 2013, it was announced that Mill Creek Entertainment had acquired the rights to various television series from the Sony Pictures library including The Nanny. They subsequently re-released the first two seasons on DVD on August 5, 2014.

On January 12, 2015, it was announced that Shout! Factory had acquired the rights to the series; they subsequently released a complete series set on May 26, 2015. It contains all 146 episodes.

In late 2015, Shout! began releasing individual season sets; the fourth season was released on September 22, 2015, followed by the fifth season on December 22, 2015. The sixth and final season was released on March 15, 2016.

Reception
The show performed poorly in its first year. When it was nearly canceled, Sagansky stepped in as its champion. According to Jacobson: "At all those affiliate meetings, he used to say, 'Stick by The Nanny!' He knew it was something special." The sitcom was the first new show delivered to CBS for the 1993 season and the highest-tested pilot at the network in years. The series was also hugely successful internationally, especially in Australia, where it was one of the highest-rated programs during the mid-to-late 1990s.

Although soon emerging as a favorite among the company, sponsors questioned whether the writers had ventured too far in terms of ethnicity and Drescher acted too obviously Jewish. The actress, however, declined to change Fran Fine into an Italian American: "On TV, you have to work fast, and the most real, the most rooted in reality to me is Jewish. I wanted to do it closest to what I knew." By contrast, the producers came to the conclusion that to oppose her should be a family of British origin, so "she wouldn't come across as Jewish so much as the American you were rooting for," Sternin explained. "The idea was to make her the American girl who happens to be Jewish rather than the Jewish girl working for the WASPs."

Awards and nominations

Reunion special

Potential revival
In June 2018, in regards to reviving the series, Drescher said, "We’re talking about it. Peter and I are talking about it," Drescher told Entertainment Tonight, referencing her ex-husband, Peter Marc Jacobson, who co-created the series with her. "She would’ve maybe gotten involved in more things [that] Fran Drescher is involved with," the actress told Entertainment Tonight. "All kinds of things from environmental issues, to health, to civil liberties, that’s what I think Fran [Fine] would be doing now — opening her big Queens mouth for the greater good."

Foreign adaptationsThe Nanny was shown in more than eighty countries worldwide. In addition, several local versions of the show have been produced in other countries. These shows follow the original scripts very closely, but with minor alterations in order to adapt to their respective country's culture. The remake in Russia was so popular that some original American writers of the show were commissioned to write new scripts after all original episodes were remade.

Stage adaptation
On January 8, 2020, it was announced that Drescher and Jacobson were writing the book for a musical adaptation of the series. Rachel Bloom and Adam Schlesinger of Crazy Ex-Girlfriend fame were to write the songs, while Marc Bruni (Beautiful: The Carole King Musical) was slated to direct. Drescher will not portray the title role, as she joked that if she did "We'd have to change the title to The Granny''." However, since Schlesinger's unexpected death from COVID-19, the status of the musical is unknown.

See also 
 List of television show franchises

Notes

References

External links 

 
 

 
1993 American television series debuts
1999 American television series endings
1990s American sitcoms
1990s American romantic comedy television series
CBS original programming
English-language television shows
Fictional nannies
Jewish comedy and humor
Metafictional television series
Television series about families
Television series about Jews and Judaism
Television series about show business
Television series about widowhood
Television series by Sony Pictures Television
Television series created by Fran Drescher
Television series created by Peter Marc Jacobson
Television shows about child care occupations
Television shows remade overseas
Television shows set in Manhattan
Works about social class